The Ecclesbourne School is a secondary school with academy status situated in Duffield, Derbyshire, England.

History
Since opening in 1957 as a small county school in the grounds of Duffield Hall, The Ecclesbourne School has had a varied organisational history. It became a co-educational 11 – 19 comprehensive school in 1976, grant maintained in 1990 and a Foundation School in 2001. Central Government recognised its excellence in 1999 by awarding ‘Beacon’ status.
The School was successful in its bid to become part of the ‘Specialist School’ programme when it was awarded Technology College status in 2001. The school has been involved in a Leading Edge Partnership since 2003; at first in the South East Derbyshire Secondary Schools Improvement Partnership, but now is focused on collaborative work with John Flamsteed Community School. The school has been awarded the Careermark twice (2004 and 2008), the Sportsmark in 2004, and was one of only two schools in Derbyshire to receive the ‘Health Promoting Schools’ award.

In 2011 the school controversially became an academy which caused a two-day strike by some teachers.

GCSE and A level results
The Ecclesbourne School attained the highest GCSE results for the whole of Derbyshire for a non-private school. 91% of the students got at least 5 GCSEs at grades A*-C.

Extracurricular activities
Student groups and activities include charity fund raising, choir, debating, drama, environmental teams, instrumental music ensembles, orchestra, mock trials, Duke of Edinburgh award and young enterprise.

Sports include athletics, basketball, cricket, dodgeball, cross-county, football, hockey, netball, rugby, squash. The Under-14 hockey team won the national title in 2004.

Notable former pupils
Nigel Hitchin, mathematician
Stefan Buczacki, horticulturist and broadcaster
Kate Pickett, co-author of The Spirit Level: Why More Equal Societies Almost Always Do Better
Hollie Webb, Olympic gold medallist in women's hockey
Daniel Trilling, journalist
Tom Howell, cricketer
Mel Reid, Professional golfer
Liam Delap , Professional Footballer

References 

Educational institutions established in 1957
Secondary schools in Derbyshire
1957 establishments in England
Academies in Derbyshire